Tomislav Glumac (born 15 May 1991) is a Croatian footballer who currently plays as a defender for Turkish club Ümraniyespor.

Club career
Glumac started his career playing at youth level for his hometown club GOŠK Dubrovnik. At the age of 15 he joined Hajduk Split where he eventually signed a professional five-year contract. In the second part of the 2009–10 season, he was loaned to Zadar to help the team avoid relegation. He was a first-team regular and played in 13 matches that season. He also remained at Zadar the following season and scored his first goal in Prva HNL in a 3–2 defeat to RNK Split. In the 2011–12 season, Glumac returned to Hajduk and made his debut for the first team on 21 October 2011 as a late substitute in the 3–0 win against Lučko. A month later, manager Krasimir Balakov announced that Glumac was no longer a part of the first team. On 9 January 2012, it was announced that Glumac was transferred to RNK Split in exchange for Goran Milović, signing a two-and-a-half-year contract.

International career
Glumac was a part of the Croatian national under-19 team in the 2010 UEFA European Under-19 Football Championship held in France. Croatia reached semi-finals where they lost 2–1 to hosts but with this achievement they qualified for the 2011 FIFA U-20 World Cup. Glumac was selected in the 21-man squad by manager Ivica Grnja despite initial objection of Hajduk as they wanted to keep the defender in case of first-team injuries. Croatia finished in the last place in the group, losing all three matches to Saudi Arabia, Nigeria and Guatemala.

References

External links

Tomislav Glumac at Sportnet.hr 

1991 births
Living people
Sportspeople from Dubrovnik
Association football defenders
Croatian footballers
Croatia youth international footballers
Croatia under-21 international footballers
HNK Hajduk Split players
NK Zadar players
RNK Split players
Balıkesirspor footballers
Ümraniyespor footballers
Croatian Football League players
TFF First League players
Croatian expatriate footballers
Expatriate footballers in Turkey
Croatian expatriate sportspeople in Turkey